WeBWorK is an online homework delivery system primarily used for mathematics and science. It allows students to complete their homework over the web, and receive instantaneous feedback as to the correctness of their responses. WeBWorK uses a Perl-based language called PG to specify exercises, which allows instructors a great deal of flexibility in how exercises are presented.

WeBWorK was originally developed at the University of Rochester by professors Michael Gage and Arnold Pizer. It is now a free software project maintained by many contributors at several colleges and universities. It is made available under the Artistic License (the same license as Perl) and the GNU General Public License. WeBWorK is currently maintained by The WeBWorK Project.

WeBWorK is currently used by many universities and high-schools around the world.

WeBWorK is supported by the National Science Foundation and the Mathematical Association of America.

References

External links
 WeBWorK Site
 Original WeBWorK Site

Learning management systems